Saphenista alpha is a species of moth of the family Tortricidae. It is found in Carchi Province, Ecuador.

The wingspan is about 15 mm. The ground colour of the forewings is white and glossy with pale brownish cream suffusions and brown dots along the wing edges. The markings are olive brown. The hindwings are brownish white, but whitish basally.

Etymology
The species name refers to the numeration of genitally similar species and is derived from the first letter of the Greek alphabet.

References

Moths described in 2007
Saphenista